{{Automatic_taxobox
| image =
| image_caption = 
| display_parents = 2
| taxon = Kolomania
| authority = Pleske, 1924
| type_species = Artemita pilosa
| type_species_authority = Pleske, 1922
| synonyms = *Acanthinoides Ôuchi, 1940Ouchimyia Nagatomi & Miyatake, 1965
}}Kolomania is a genus of flies in the family Stratiomyidae.

SpeciesKolomania albopilosa (Nagatomi, 1975)Kolomania nipponensis (Ôuchi, 1940)Kolomania pilosa'' (Pleske, 1922)

References

Stratiomyidae
Brachycera genera
Diptera of Asia